Roy Maxton Crumpler (July 8, 1896 – October 6, 1969) was a pitcher in Major League Baseball. He played for the Detroit Tigers and Philadelphia Phillies.

References

External links

1896 births
1969 deaths
Major League Baseball pitchers
Detroit Tigers players
Philadelphia Phillies players
Baseball players from North Carolina
Portland Beavers players
San Francisco Seals (baseball) players
Salt Lake City Bees players
Galveston Sand Crabs players
Waco Cubs players
Rochester Tribe players
Durham Bulls players
People from Clinton, North Carolina